Takinozeki  is an earthfill dam located in Chiba Prefecture in Japan. The dam is used for irrigation. The catchment area of the dam is 0.5 km2. The dam impounds about 2  ha of land when full and can store 31 thousand cubic meters of water. The construction of the dam was started on 1930 and completed in 1937.

References

Dams in Chiba Prefecture
1937 establishments in Japan